Lipovina may refer to:
 Hárslevelű, a grape variety
 Vladan Lipovina (born 1993), Montenegrin handball player

See also